Shane Austin (born June 14, 1989) is a former American football quarterback. He played college football at University of Hawai'i. Austin went undrafted in the 2012 NFL Draft and signed with the Everett Raptors of the Indoor Football League (IFL) after the draft. After starting the Raptors final games of the season, Austin was able to gain the attention of the Pittsburgh Power of the AFL. Austin was named the starting quarterback for the Power, but a broken hand caused him to miss two months of the season. Austin then was assigned to the Cleveland Gladiators where he was named the backup to Chris Dieker. With Dieker struggling for the Gladiators, Austin was given the opportunity to start and lead the Gladiators to a 14–1 record as a starter and a berth in ArenaBowl XXVII. The Gladiators lost to Arizona Rattlers in the ArenaBowl, but Austin was named Second Team All-Arena.

Early life
Born June 14, 1989 in Santa Monica, California to Cathy and Dave Austin. He attended Rio Mesa High School in Oxnard, California, where he participated in football. As a junior, Austin split time with Chris Gagua, completing 52-of-81 passes with five touchdowns and three interceptions. Austin was the lone starter for the Spartans in 2006 and broke many school records for passing.

College career
Austin's late development as a quarterback lead to his light recruitment from Football Bowl Subdivision schools, but he was offered a chance to walk-on to the football team at the University of Hawai'i, and accepted the team's offer. Austin spent his true freshman season as a redshirt for the Warriors, and didn't see any playing time as a redshirt freshman. In 2008, Austin was given the opportunity to compete for the starting quarterback spot, and won a start versus San Jose State when starter Bryant Moniz was out with an injury. Austin threw for a career-high 299-yards against the Spartans, including a 10-yard pass to Kealoha Pilares on third down in overtime. The following week Austin was once again backing up Moniz. In 2010, Austin was listed as the backup to Moniz again. He was action in the season opener again USC as Moniz left the game with an injury. Austin completed 6-of-9 passes for 141 yards and two touchdowns. In 2011, Austin received another chance to start, this time against Fresno State. Austin struggled, and was pulled in the first half in favor of David Graves.

College career statistics

Professional career
Prior to the 2012 NFL Draft, Austin was projected to be undrafted by NFLDraftScout.com. He was rated as the 56th best quarterback in the draft.

Everett Raptors
He was signed by the Everett Raptors as an undrafted free agent in 2012. Austin joined the 2–5 Raptors at the midway point of their season after starting quarterback Blake Bolles had signed with the Minnesota Vikings for training camp, and received just one practice with the Raptors before he was thrust in to the starting quarterback role. Austin caught on quickly to indoor football, leading the Raptors to 59 points in his first game (the Raptors had been averaging 44.0 points a game). Austin was able to help the Raptors keep their playoff hopes alive, leading them to a 2–2 record in his first 4 games. But the Raptors finished 1–2 in their final 3 games, missing out on the final Intense Conference playoff spot. Austin finished the season with 1,546 yards passing and 38 passing touchdowns, along with 285 rushing yards and two touchdowns rushing.

Pittsburgh Power
Austin was assigned to the Pittsburgh Power of the Arena Football League (AFL) for the 2013 season. Austin served as the team's backup quarterback for the first 16 weeks of the season, appearing in 3 games. During the team's Week 13 game against the Philadelphia Soul, Austin received his first extended playing time after starter Derek Cassidy was pulled for his play. The game ended in a 21–59 defeat, with Austin throwing for 3 touchdowns and was intercepted twice. Austin would not see the field again until he was named the starting quarterback Week 17 against the San Jose SaberCats. Austin and the Power struggled mightily, losing 78–20. By losing by 58 points, the Power set an AFL record margin of victory for a home loss. Despite struggling in his first start, Austin started the remaining 2 games of the season for the Power, winning 48–37 at the Tampa Bay Storm, and losing 61–43 to the Spokane Shock.

Cleveland Gladiators
Austin began the season as the backup quarterback to Chris Dieker. With Dieker struggling in each of the team's second and third games, Austin came in relief and rallied the Gladiators to win both games. When it came to Week 4 of the regular season, Austin became the starting quarterback for the Gladiators. The 2014 Cleveland Gladiators finished the season with a record of seventeen wins and one loss. They lost 32–72 in ArenaBowl XXVII to the Arizona Rattlers on August 23, 2014.

Portland Steel
On November 30, 2015, Austin was assigned to the Portland Thunder.  On February 24, 2016, the franchise changed its name from Thunder to Steel. He was placed on league suspension on March 17, 2016, so he could tryout for the Saskatchewan Roughriders of the Canadian Football League.  He re-joined the team in mid-May 2016.

Shanghai Skywalkers
Austin was drafted by the Shanghai Skywalkers in the first round of the China Arena Football League draft in 2016. He earned CAFL Offensive MVP and All-Pro South Division All-Star honors in 2016 after completing 121 of 191 passes for 1,436 yards, 35 touchdowns and 5 interceptions. He also rushed for 74 yards and 4 touchdowns. He was listed on the Skywalkers' roster for the 2018 season.

Washington Valor
On May 3, 2018, Austin was assigned to the Washington Valor. On May 29, 2018, he was placed on reassignment.

Philadelphia Soul
On June 5, 2018, Austin was assigned to the Philadelphia Soul.

AFL statistics

Stats from ArenaFan:

References

External links
Hawai'i bio 
Arena Football League bio 

1989 births
Living people
American football quarterbacks
Hawaii Rainbow Warriors football players
Pittsburgh Power players
Cleveland Gladiators players
Everett Raptors players
Philadelphia Soul players
Portland Thunder players
Portland Steel players
Shanghai Skywalkers players
Washington Valor players
Players of American football from Santa Monica, California